This is a list of high schools in the state of New York. It contains only schools currently open. For former schools, see List of closed secondary schools in New York and :Category:Defunct schools in New York (state).

Unless otherwise indicated, all schools are public (government funded) and do not serve any grades lower than fifth grade.

Albany County

Public

Albany High School, Albany
Berne-Knox-Westerlo Secondary School, Berne
Bethlehem Central High School, Delmar
Clayton A. Bouton High School, Voorheesville
Cohoes High School, Cohoes
Colonie Central High School, Colonie
Green Tech Charter High School, Albany
Guilderland High School, Guilderland Center
Heatly Junior-Senior High School, Green Island
Ravena-Coeymans-Selkirk High School, Ravena
Shaker High School, Latham
Watervliet Junior-Senior High School, Watervliet

Private

Academy of the Holy Names, Albany
The Albany Academy, Albany
Albany Academy for Girls, Albany
Bishop Maginn High School, Albany
Christian Brothers Academy, Colonie
La Salle School, Albany
Latham Christian Academy (PK-12), Latham
Loudonville Christian School (PK-12), Loudonville
Mount Moriah Christian Academy (PK-12), Glenmont
Saint Anne Institute (PK-12), Albany

Allegany County

Public

Alfred-Almond Junior-Senior High School, Almond
Andover Central School, Andover
Belfast Central School, Belfast
Bolivar-Richburg Middle/High School, Bolivar 
Canaseraga School, Canaseraga
Cuba-Rushford High School, Cuba
Fillmore Central School, Fillmore
Friendship Central School, Friendship
 Genesee Valley Central School, Belmont 
Scio Central School, Scio
Wellsville High School, Wellsville
Whitesville Central School, Whitesville

Private
Houghton Academy, Houghton

Bronx County

Broome County

Public

Binghamton High School, Binghamton
Chenango Forks High School, Binghamton
Chenango Valley High School, Binghamton
Harpursville Junior-Senior High School, Harpursville
Johnson City High School, Johnson City 
Maine-Endwell High School, Endwell
Susquehanna Valley High School, Conklin
Union-Endicott High School, Endicott
Vestal High School, Vestal
Whitney Point High School, Whitney Point 
Windsor High School, Windsor

Private

Central Baptist Christian Academy, Binghamton
Ross Corners Christian Academy, Vestal
Seton Catholic Central High School, Binghamton

Cattaraugus County

Public

Allegany-Limestone High School, Allegany 
Ten Broeck Academy, Franklinville 
Cattaraugus-Little Valley High School, Cattaraugus 
Ellicottville Middle School High School, Ellicottville 
Gowanda High School, Gowanda 
Hinsdale Middle/High School, Hinsdale 
Olean High School, Olean
Pioneer High School, Yorkshire 
Portville Central School High School, Portville 
Randolph Academy, Randolph 
Randolph Junior/Senior High School, Randolph 
Salamanca Junior/Senior High School, Salamanca 
West Valley Middle/High School, West Valley

Private

Archbishop Walsh High School, Olean
Central Baptist Christian School, Yorkshire 
New Life Christian School, Olean 
Portville Baptist Christian School, Portville

Cayuga County

Auburn High School, Auburn 
Cato-Meridian High School, Cato 
Moravia High School, Moravia
Southern Cayuga High School, Poplar Ridge
Tyburn Academy of Mary Immaculate (private), Auburn 
Union Springs Academy (private), Union Springs
Union Springs High School, Union Springs 
Weedsport Junior/Senior High School, Weedsport
Dana L. West Junior/Senior High School, Port Byron

Chautauqua County

Bethel Baptist Christian Academy (private K-12), Jamestown 
Brocton Middle School/ High School, Brocton 
Cassadaga Valley Middle High School, Sinclairville 
Chautauqua Lake Secondary School, Mayville 
Clymer Central School, Clymer 
Dunkirk High School, Dunkirk
Falconer Middle/High School, Falconer 
Forestville Middle/High School, Forestville 
Fredonia High School, Fredonia
Frewsburg Middle School/High School, Frewsburg 
Gustavus Adolphus Learning Center, Jamestown 
Jamestown High School, Jamestown
Maple Grove Junior-Senior High School, Bemus Point 
Panama Central School, Panama 
Pine Valley Central Junior/Senior High School, South Dayton 
Ripley Central School, Ripley 
Sherman Central School, Sherman 
Silver Creek High School, Silver Creek
Southwestern Central High School, Jamestown
Westfield Academy and Central School, Westfield

Chemung County

Thomas A. Edison High School, Elmira Heights 
Elmira Alternative High School, Elmira 
Elmira Christian Academy (private PK-12), Elmira 
Elmira Free Academy, Elmira
Horseheads High School, Horseheads
Notre Dame High School (private), Elmira
Southside High School, Elmira
Twin Tiers Christian Academy (private), Breesport

Chenango County

Afton Middle School High School, Afton
Bainbridge-Guilford High School, Bainbridge
Greene High School, Greene
Norwich High School, Norwich
Otselic Valley Central School, South Otselic
Oxford Academy High School, Oxford
Sherburne-Earlville Central School, Sherburne
Unadilla Valley High School, New Berlin
Valley Heights Christian Academy (private PK-12), Norwich

Clinton County

AuSable Valley High School, Clintonville
Beekmantown High School, West Chazy
Chazy Central Rural Junior/Senior High School, Chazy
Northeastern Clinton High School, Champlain
Northern Adirondack Middle/High School, Ellenburg Depot
Peru High School, Peru
Plattsburgh High School, Plattsburgh
Saranac High School, Saranac
Seton Catholic Central High School, Plattsburgh

Columbia County

Berkshire Junior/Senior High School, Canaan
Brookwood Secure Center (OCFS), Claverack
Chatham High School, Chatham
Columbia Christian Academy (private K-12), Ghent 
Ichabod Crane High School, Valatie
Darrow School (private), New Lebanon
Germantown Central School, Germantown
Hawthorne Valley Waldorf School (private PK-12), Ghent 
Hudson High School, Hudson
New Lebanon Junior/Senior High School, New Lebanon
Taconic Hills High School, Craryville

Cortland County

Cincinnatus Junior/Senior High School, Cincinnatus
Cortland Christian Academy (private PK-12), Cortland 
Cortland Junior Senior High School, Cortland 
Homer Senior High School, Homer
Marathon Christian Academy (private PK-12), Marathon 
Marathon High School, Marathon
McGraw High School, McGraw

Delaware County

Allynwood Academy (private), Hancock
Andes Central School (PK-12), Andes 
Charlotte Valley Central School (PK-12), Davenport 
Delaware Academy High School, Delhi 
Deposit Junior/Senior High School, Deposit 
Downsville Central School (K-12), Downsville 
Franklin Central School (PK-12), Franklin 
Hancock Middle/High School, Hancock
Margaretville Central School (PK-12), Margaretville 
O'Neill (Walton) High School, Walton 
Roxbury Central School (PK-12), Roxbury 
Sidney High School, Sidney
South Kortright Central School (PK-12), South Kortright 
Stamford Central School (PK-12), Stamford

Dutchess County

Public

Arlington High School, LaGrangeville
Beacon High School, Beacon
Dover High School, Dover Plains
John Jay High School, Hopewell Junction
Roy C. Ketcham High School, Wappingers Falls
Millbrook High School, Millbrook
Orchard View Alternative High School, Wappingers Falls 
Pawling High School, Pawling 
Poughkeepsie High School, Poughkeepsie
Red Hook High School, Red Hook 
Rhinebeck High School, Rhinebeck 
Franklin Delano Roosevelt High School, Hyde Park
Spackenkill High School, Poughkeepsie
Stissing Mountain High School, Pine Plains 
Webutuck High School, Amenia

Private

Bethel Christian Academy (3-12), Hopewell Junction
The Kildonan School (3-12), Amenia
Millbrook School, Millbrook
Oakwood Friends School, Poughkeepsie
Our Lady of Lourdes High School, Poughkeepsie
Poughkeepsie Day School (PK-12), Poughkeepsie
The Randolph School (PK-12), Wappingers Falls 
Tabernacle Christian Academy, Poughkeepsie
Trinity-Pawling School, Pawling
Upton Lake Christian School (K-12), Clinton Corners

Erie County

Public

Akron High School, Akron 
Alden High School, Alden
Alternative Learning Center, West Seneca 
Amherst Central High School, Amherst
Bennett High School, Buffalo
Buffalo Academy of Science Charter School, Buffalo 
Buffalo Academy for Visual and Performing Arts (5-12), Buffalo
Burgard Vocational High School, Buffalo
Charter School For Applied Technologies (K-12), Buffalo 
Cheektowaga Central High School, Cheektowaga 
City Honors School, Buffalo
Clarence High School, Clarence
Cleveland Hill High School, Cheektowaga
Depew High School, Depew
East Aurora High School, East Aurora
East High School, Buffalo
Eden Junior/Senior High School, Eden 
PS 302 Emerson School Of Hospitality, Buffalo 
Frontier Central High School, Hamburg
Global Concets Charter High School, Lackawanna
Grand Island High School, Grand Island
Hamburg High School, Hamburg
PS 84 Health Care Center for Children at ECMC, Buffalo 
Holland Junior/Senior High School, Holland
Hopevale School, Hamburg 
Hutchinson Central Technical High School, Buffalo
The International Preparatory School, Buffalo
Iroquois High School, Elma
Kenmore East High School, Tonawanda (Town)
Kenmore West Senior High School, Kenmore
John F. Kennedy High School, Cheektowaga
Lackawanna High School, Lackawanna 
Lafayette High School, Buffalo
Lake Shore High School, Angola
Lancaster High School, Lancaster
Leonardo da Vinci High School, Buffalo
Maryvale High School, Cheektowaga
Math, Science, Technology Preparatory School, Buffalo
McKinley Vocational High School, Buffalo
North Collins Junior/Senior High School, North Collins 
PS 42 Occupational Training Center, Buffalo 
Oracle Charter School, Buffalo 
Orchard Park High School, Orchard Park
PS 208 Riverside Academy, Buffalo
Riverside Institute of Technology, Buffalo (closed)
South Park High School, Buffalo
Springville-Griffith Institute, Springville
Sweet Home High School, Amherst
Tapestry Charter School, Buffalo 
Tonawanda High School, Tonawanda
West Seneca East Senior High School, West Seneca
West Seneca West Senior High School, West Seneca 
Western New York Maritime Charter School, Buffalo 
Williamsville East High School, East Amherst
Williamsville North High School, Williamsville
Williamsville South High School, Williamsville

Private

Baker Hall School, Lackawanna 
Baker Victory Services (PK-12), Lackawanna 
The Baptist School (PK-12), Tonawanda 
Bishop Timon – St. Jude High School, Buffalo
Buffalo Academy of the Sacred Heart, Amherst
Buffalo Seminary, Buffalo
Canisius High School, Buffalo
Cardinal O'Hara High School, Tonawanda
Center Road Christian Academy (1-12), West Seneca 
Christian Central Academy (K-12), Williamsville 
Gateway-Longview Lynde School (PK-12), Williamsville 
The Gow School, South Wales
Holy Angels Academy, Buffalo
Immaculata Academy, Hamburg
Mount Mercy Academy, Buffalo
Mount St. Mary Academy, Kenmore
Nardin Academy, Buffalo
Nichols School, Buffalo
The Park School of Buffalo (PK-12), Snyder
St. Francis High School, Athol Springs
St. Joseph's Collegiate Institute, Buffalo
St. Mary's High School, Lancaster
St. Mary's School For The Deaf (PK-12), Buffalo 
West Seneca Christian School (PK-12), West Seneca

Essex County

Crown Point Central School (PK-12), Crown Point
Elizabethtown-Lewis Central School (K-12), Elizabethtown 
Keene Central School (K-12), Keene Valley 
Lake Placid Middle/High School, Lake Placid 
Minerva Central School (PK-12), Olmstedville 
Moriah Junior/Senior High School, Port Henry
Mountainside Christian Academy (private PK-12), Schroon Lake 
National Sports Academy (private), Lake Placid 
Newcomb Central School (PK-12), Newcomb 
Northwood School (private), Lake Placid
Schroon Lake Central School (K-12), Schroon Lake 
Ticonderoga High School, Ticonderoga
Westport Central School (K-12), Westport 
Willsboro Central School (PK-12), Willsboro

Franklin County

Brushton-Moira High School, Brushton 
Chateaugay High School, Chateaugay 
Franklin Academy High School, Malone 
St. Regis Falls Central School (PK-12), St. Regis Falls 
Salmon River High School, Fort Covington 
Saranac Lake High School, Saranac Lake
Tupper Lake Middle-High School, Tupper Lake

Fulton County

Broadalbin-Perth High School, Broadalbin 
Gloversville High School, Gloversville 
Johnstown High School, Johnstown
Mayfield Central School, Mayfield 
Northville High School, Northville
Perth Bible Christian Academy (private PK-12), Amsterdam

Genesee County

Alexander Middle-High School, Alexander 
Batavia High School, Batavia
Byron-Bergen Junior/Senior High School, Bergen
Elba Junior/Senior High School, Elba 
Le Roy Junior/Senior High School, Le Roy 
Notre Dame High School, Batavia
Oakfield-Alabama Middle/High School, Oakfield 
Pavilion Middle/High School, Pavilion 
Pembroke Junior/Senior High School, Corfu

Greene County

Cairo-Durham High School, Cairo 
Catskill High School, Catskill 
Coxsackie-Athens High School, Coxsackie 
Grapeville Christian School (private K-12), Climax 
Greenville High School, Greenville
Hunter-Tannersville Middle / High School, Tannersville 
Windham-Ashland-Jewett Central School (K-12), Windham

Hamilton County

Indian Lake Central School (PK-12), Indian Lake 
Long Lake Central School (PK-12), Long Lake 
Wells School (PK-12), Wells

Herkimer County

Central Valley Academy, Ilion
Frankfort-Schuyler High School, Frankfort 
James A. Green High School, Dolgeville 
Herkimer High School, Herkimer
Little Falls High School, Little Falls 
Mohawk Valley Christian Academy (private K-12), Little Falls 
Mount Markham High School, West Winfield 
Poland Central School, Poland
Town of Webb School, Old Forge 
West Canada Valley Middle/High School, Newport 
Owen D. Young Central School (K-12), Van Hornesville

Jefferson County

Alexandria Central School, Alexandria Bay 
Belleville-Henderson Central School (PK-12), Belleville 
Carthage Senior High School, Carthage
Faith Fellowship Christian School (private PK-12), Watertown 
General Brown Junior-Senior High School, Dexter 
Immaculate Heart Central High School (private), Watertown
Indian River High School, Philadelphia
LaFargeville Central School (PK-12), LaFargeville 
Lyme Central School (PK-12), Chaumont 
Sackets Harbor Central School (K-12), Sackets Harbor
South Jefferson Senior High School, Adams 
Thousand Islands High School, Clayton 
Watertown High School, Watertown

Kings County

Lewis County

Beaver River Central School, Beaver Falls
Copenhagen Central School (PK-12), Copenhagen 
Harrisville Junior/Senior High School, Harrisville 
Lowville Academy, Lowville 
River Valley Mennonite School (private K-12), Castorland 
South Lewis High School, Turin

Livingston County

Avon High School, Avon
Caledonia-Mumford High School, Caledonia 
Dansville 7-12 School, Dansville 
Geneseo Middle/High School, Geneseo
Lima Christian School (private K-12), Lima
Livonia High School, Livonia
Mount Morris Junior/Senior High School, Mount Morris
Nunda Middle & High School, Nunda 
York Middle/High School, Retsof

Madison County

Brookfield Central School (PK-12), Brookfield 
Canastota High School, Canastota
Cazenovia High School, Cazenovia 
Chittenango High School, Chittenango 
DeRuyter Central School, DeRuyter
Hamilton Junior/Senior High School, Hamilton 
Madison Central School (PK-12), Madison 
Morrisville-Eaton Central School, Morrisville
New Life Christian School (private PK-12), Hamilton 
Oneida Senior High School, Oneida 
Stockbridge Valley Central School (PK-12), Munnsville

Monroe County

Public (Rochester City School District)

Note that  this district is changing school names, campuses and functions rapidly, so the information here may be out of date. Due to these rapid changes, NCES identifiers and data are not available for many schools since that data lags by a year or two.

All City High
Charlotte High School
Douglass Campus
Northeast College Preparatory School
Northwest College Preparatory School
East High School
Edison Campus
Robert Brown High School of Construction and Design 
Leadership Academy for Young Men
Rochester STEM High School 
Franklin High School, Rochester 
Integrated Arts and Technology High School 
Vanguard Collegiate High School 
Thomas Jefferson High School
Rochester International Academy
James Monroe High School
School of the Arts
School Without Walls
Wilson Magnet High School

Schools in other public districts

Arcadia High School, Greece
Brighton High School, Brighton
Brockport High School, Brockport
Churchville-Chili High School, Churchville
East Rochester Junior-Senior High School, East Rochester
Eastridge High School, Irondequoit
Fairport High School, Fairport
Gates-Chili High School, Gates
Greece Athena High School, Greece
Greece Olympia High School, Greece
Hilton High School, Hilton
Honeoye Falls–Lima High School, Honeoye Falls
Irondequoit High School, Irondequoit
Odyssey Academy, Greece
Penfield High School, Penfield
Pittsford Mendon High School, Pittsford
Pittsford Sutherland High School, Pittsford
Rochester Academy Charter School, Rochester
Rush–Henrietta Senior High School, Henrietta
Spencerport High School, Spencerport
Webster Schroeder High School, Webster
Webster Thomas High School, Webster
Wheatland Chili High School, Scottsville

Private

Allendale Columbia School (PK-12), Brighton
Aquinas Institute, Rochester
Archangel School (K-12), Rochester 
Cornerstone Christian Academy (K-12), Brockport 
Charles Finney School (K-12), Penfield 
The Harley School (PK-12), Brighton
Hillside Children's Center - Andrews Trahey Campus (2-12), Rochester 
Hillside Children's Center - Halpern Education Center (6-12), Webster 
The Norman Howard School (4-12), Rochester 
Bishop Kearney High School, Irondequoit
Lake Ontario Baptist Academy (K-12), Hilton 
Lakeside Alpha / Lakeside Learning (3-12), Webster (also see Talk) 
McQuaid Jesuit High School, Brighton
Nazareth Academy, Rochester
Northstar Christian Academy (K-12), Rochester 
Ora Academy, Rochester 
Our Lady of Mercy School for Young Women, Brighton
Rochester Seventh-day Adventist Academy (PK-12), Scottsville 
Saint Joseph's Villa, Rochester 
Southeast Christian Academy (1-12), Penfield 
Talmudical Institute of Upstate New York, Rochester 
Webster Christian School (PK-12), Webster

Montgomery County

Amsterdam High School, Amsterdam 
Canajoharie High School, Canajoharie 
Faith Bible Academy (private K-12), Sprakers 
Fonda-Fultonville High School, Fonda 
Fort Plain Junior/Senior High School, Fort Plain 
Oppenheim-Ephratah-St. Johnsville High School, St. Johnsville 
Victory Christian Academy (private PK-12), Fort Plain

Nassau County

Public

Baldwin Senior High School, Baldwin
Bethpage High School, Bethpage
Sanford H. Calhoun High School, Merrick
H. Frank Carey Junior-Senior High School, Franklin Square
Carle Place Middle/High School, Carle Place
W. Tresper Clarke High School, Westbury
Division Avenue High School, Levittown
East Meadow High School, East Meadow
East Rockaway High School, East Rockaway
Elmont Memorial Junior – Senior High School, Elmont
Farmingdale High School, Farmingdale
Floral Park Memorial High School, Floral Park
Freeport High School, Freeport
Garden City High School, Garden City
Glen Cove High School, Glen Cove
Great Neck North High School, Great Neck
Great Neck South High School, Great Neck
Harriet Eisman Community School, Long Beach
Hempstead High School, Hempstead
Herricks High School, New Hyde Park
George W. Hewlett High School, Hewlett
Hicksville High School, Hicksville 
Island Trees High School, Levittown
Jericho High School, Jericho
John F. Kennedy High School, Bellmore
Lawrence High School, Cedarhurst
Locust Valley High School, Locust Valley
Long Beach High School, Long Beach
Lynbrook Senior High School, Lynbrook
General Douglas MacArthur High School, Levittown
Malverne High School, Malverne 
Manhasset Secondary School, Manhasset
Massapequa High School, Massapequa
Wellington C. Mepham High School, Bellmore
Mineola High School, Garden City Park
New Hyde Park Memorial High School, New Hyde Park
North Shore High School, Glen Head
Oceanside High School, Oceanside
Oceanside High School Castleton, Oceanside 
Oyster Bay High School, Oyster Bay
Plainedge High School, Massapequa
Plainview – Old Bethpage John F. Kennedy High School, Plainview
Roosevelt High School, Roosevelt
Roslyn High School, Roslyn Heights
Seaford High School, Seaford
Paul D. Schreiber Senior High School, Port Washington
Sewanhaka High School, Floral Park
South Side High School, Rockville Centre
Syosset High School, Syosset
Uniondale High School, Uniondale
Valley Stream Central High School, Valley Stream
Valley Stream North High School, Franklin Square
Valley Stream South High School, Valley Stream
Village School, Great Neck
Wantagh Senior High School, Wantagh
West Hempstead High School, West Hempstead
Westbury High School, Old Westbury
The Wheatley School, Old Westbury

Private

Stella K. Abraham High School for Girls, Hewlett Bay Park
Chaminade High School, Mineola
Crescent School (K-12), Hempstead 
Harriet Eisman Community School, Long Beach 
Friends Academy (PK-12), Locust Valley
Grace Christian Academy (K-12), Merrick 
Harmony Heights School (8-12), East Norwich
Hebrew Academy of the Five Towns and Rockaway, Cedarhurst
Hebrew Academy of Long Beach, Long Beach
Hebrew Academy of Nassau County (7-12), Uniondale 
Holy Trinity Diocesan High School, Hicksville
Kellenberg Memorial High School (6-12), Uniondale
Lawrence Woodmere Academy (PK-12), Woodmere
Long Island Lutheran Middle and High School (6-12), Brookville
Mesivta Ateres Yaakov, Lawrence
Mesivta School of Long Beach (AKA Torah High School), Long Beach 
Midreshet Shalhevet High School For Girls, North Woodmere
Mill Neck Manor School For The Deaf (PK-12), Mill Neck 
New Jerusalem Christian Academy (1-12), Farmingdale 
North Shore Hebrew Academy, Great Neck
Our Lady of Mercy Academy, Syosset
Portledge School (PK-12), Locust Valley
Rambam Mesivta, Lawrence 
Sacred Heart Academy, Hempstead
Schechter School of Long Island (K-12), Williston Park 
St. Dominic High School, Oyster Bay
St. Mary's High School, Manhasset
Valley Stream Christian Academy (K-12), Valley Stream 
Vincent Smith School (4-12), Port Washington 
Henry Viscardi School (PK-12), Albertson
The Waldorf School Of Garden City (PK-12), Garden City 
Westbrook Preparatory School, Westbury
Woodward Mental Health Center (K-12), Freeport

New York County

Niagara County

Barker Junior/Senior High School, Barker 
Christian Academy of Western New York (private PK-12), North Tonawanda 
Henrietta G Lewis Campus School (private 2-12), Lockport (town) 
Lewiston-Porter High School, Youngstown
Lockport High School, Lockport (city) 
Newfane High School, Newfane 
Niagara Catholic High School (private), Niagara Falls
Niagara Falls High School, Niagara Falls
Niagara-Wheatfield High School, Sanborn
North Tonawanda High School, North Tonawanda
Royalton-Hartland Junior/Senior High School, Middleport
Starpoint High School, Pendleton
Wilson High School, Wilson

Oneida County

Public

Adirondack High School, Boonville 
Camden High School, Camden
Clinton High School, Clinton
Holland Patent High School, Holland Patent
New Hartford Senior High School, New Hartford 
New York Mills Junior/Senior High School, New York Mills 
Oriskany Junior/Senior High School, Oriskany 
Thomas R. Proctor High School, Utica
Remsen Junior/Senior High School, Remsen 
Rome Free Academy, Rome 
Sauquoit Valley High School, Sauquoit 
Vernon-Verona-Sherrill High School, Verona
Waterville Central Jr./Sr. High School, Waterville 
Westmoreland High School, Westmoreland 
Whitesboro High School, Marcy

Private

Faith Christian School (2-12), Bridgewater (village) 
Holy Cross Academy, Vernon (Oneida mailing address)
Notre Dame Junior Senior High School, Utica
Rome Catholic Junior/Senior High School, Rome 
Tilton School (1-12), Utica 
Tradewinds Education Center (K-12), Utica

Onondaga County

Bishop Grimes Junior/Senior High School, East Syracuse
Bishop Ludden Junior/Senior High School, Syracuse
Charles W. Baker High School, Baldwinsville
Christian Brothers Academy, DeWitt
Cicero–North Syracuse High School, Cicero
Corcoran High School, Syracuse
East Syracuse-Minoa Central High School, East Syracuse
Fabius-Pompey High School, Fabius
Faith Heritage School, Syracuse
Fayetteville–Manlius High School, Manlius
George Fowler High School, Syracuse
Henninger High School, Syracuse
Institute of Technology at Syracuse Central, Syracuse
Jamesville-DeWitt High School, DeWitt
Jordan-Elbridge High School, Jordan
Lafayette Junior/Senior High School, Lafayette
Liverpool High School, Liverpool
Living Word Academy, East Syracuse
Manlius Pebble Hill School, DeWitt
Marcellus High School, Marcellus
Nottingham High School, Syracuse
Onondaga Junior/Senior High School, Nedrow
Skaneateles High School, Skaneateles
Solvay High School, Solvay
Tully Junior Senior High School, Tully
West Genesee High School, Camillus
Westhill Senior High School, Syracuse

Ontario County

Bloomfield High School, Bloomfield
Canandaigua Academy, Canandaigua

Geneva High School, Geneva
Honeoye High School, Richmond
Marcus Whitman High School, Rushville
Midlakes High School, Clifton Springs
Naples High School, Naples
Red Jacket High School, Shortsville

Victor Senior High School, Victor

Orange County

George F. Baker High School, Tuxedo Park
John S. Burke Catholic High School, Goshen
Chester Academy, Chester
Cornwall Central High School, New Windsor
Goshen Central High School, Goshen
Goshen Research Center, Goshen
Middletown High School, Middletown
Minisink Valley High School, Slate Hill
Monroe-Woodbury High School, Central Valley
New York Military Academy (residential), Cornwall-on-Hudson
Newburgh Free Academy, Newburgh
James I. O'Neill High School, Fort Montgomery
Pine Bush High School, Pine Bush
Port Jervis High School, Port Jervis
S. S. Seward Institute, Florida
Storm King School, Cornwall-on-Hudson
Valley Central High School, Montgomery
Warwick Valley High School, Warwick
Washingtonville High School, Washingtonville

Orleans County

Albion High School, Albion
Holley Junior/Senior High School, Holley
Kendall Junior/Senior High School, Kendall
Medina High School, Medina
L.A. Webber High School, Lyndonville

Oswego County

Altmar-Parish-Williamstown High School, Parish
John C. Birdlebough High School, Phoenix
G. Ray Bodley High School, Fulton
Hannibal High School, Hannibal
Mexico High School, Mexico
Paul V. Moore High School, Central Square
Oswego High School, Oswego
Pulaski Junior/Senior High School, Pulaski
Sandy Creek High School, Sandy Creek

Otsego County

Cherry Valley-Springfield Junior/Senior High School, Cherry Valley
Cooperstown Junior/Senior High School, Cooperstown
Edmeston Middle & High School, Edmeston
Franklin Junior/Senior High School, Franklin
Gilbertsville-Mount Upton Junior/Senior High School, Gilbertsville
Laurens Junior/Senior High School, Laurens
Milford Junior/Senior High School, Milford
Morris Junior/Senior High School, Morris
Oneonta High School, Oneonta
Schenevus Junior/Senior High School, Schenevus
Unatego Junior/Senior High School, Otego
Worcester Junior/Senior High School, Worcester

Putnam County

Public

Brewster High School, Brewster
Carmel High School, Carmel
Haldane Junior/Senior High School, Cold Spring
Mahopac High School, Mahopac
Putnam Valley High School, Putnam Valley

Private
Longview School, Brewster (PK-12)

Queens County

Rensselaer County

Averill Park High School, Averill Park
Berlin Central High School, Berlin
Catholic Central High School, Troy
Columbia High School, East Greenbush
Hoosac School, Hoosick
Hoosic Valley High School, Schaghticoke
Hoosick Falls High School, Hoosick Falls
La Salle Institute, Troy
Lansingburgh High School, Troy
Maple Hill High School, Castleton
Rensselaer High School, Rensselaer
Tamarac Secondary School, Troy
Tech Valley High School, Rensselaer
Troy High School, Troy
Vanderheyden School, Wynantskill
Emma Willard School, Troy

Richmond County

Rockland County

Albertus Magnus High School, Bardonia
Bais Yaakov of Ramapo School, Monsey
Bais Yaakov of Spring Valley School, Monsey
Bat Torah Academy, Suffern
Clarkstown High School North, New City
Clarkstown High School South, West Nyack
Congregation Mesifta Ohr Hatal School, Monsey
Mesivta Beth Shraga School, Monsey
Mesivta Ohr Naftoli School, Monsey
Nanuet Senior High School, Nanuet
North Rockland High School, Thiells
Nyack High School, Upper Nyack
Pearl River High School, Pearl River
Ramapo High School, Town of Ramapo
Shaarei Torah School of Rockland, Suffern
Spring Valley High School, Spring Valley
Suffern High School, Suffern
Summit Children's Residence Center, Nyack
Tappan Zee High School, Orangeburg
Yeshiva Gedola School of South Monsey, Monsey
Yeshiva High School of Monsey, Monsey
Yeshiva Ohr Reuven School, Suffern
Yeshiva Ohel Torah School, Monsey
Yeshiva Shaar Ephraim School, Monsey

St. Lawrence County

Brasher Falls Middle/Senior High School, Brasher Falls; district known locally known as St. Lawrence Central (see below)
Clifton-Fine Junior/Senior High School, Star Lake
Colton-Pierrepont Junior/Senior High School, Colton
Edwards-Knox Junior/Senior High School, Russell
Edwin Gould
Gouverneur Junior/Senior High School, Gouverneur
Hammond Junior/Senior High School, Hammond
Heuvelton Junior/Senior High School, Heuvelton
Hermon-Dekalb Junior/Senior High School, Dekalb Junction
Lisbon Junior/Senior High School, Lisbon
Madrid–Waddington Central School, Madrid
Massena Central High School, Massena
Morristown Junior/Senior High School, Morristown
Norwood-Norfolk Junior/Senior High School, Norwood
Ogdensburg Free Academy, Ogdensburg
Parishville-Hopkinton Junior/Senior High School, Parishville
Potsdam High School, Potsdam
St. Lawrence High School, Brasher Falls
H.C. Williams High School, Canton

Saratoga County

Ballston Spa High School, Ballston Spa
Burnt Hills-Ballston Lake High School, Burnt Hills
Corinth High School, Corinth
Galway High School, Galway
Mechanicville High School, Mechanicville
Saratoga Central Catholic High School, Saratoga Springs
Saratoga Springs High School, Saratoga Springs
Schuylerville Junior/Senior High School, Schuylerville
Shenendehowa High School, Clifton Park
South Glens Falls High School, South Glens Falls
Stillwater CSD High School, Stillwater
Waterford High School, Waterford

Schenectady County

Duanesburg High School, Delanson
Mohonasen High School, Rotterdam
Notre Dame-Bishop Gibbons High School, Schenectady
Niskayuna High School, Niskayuna
Oak Hill School , Glenville
Schalmont High School, Rotterdam
Schenectady Christian School, Scotia
Schenectady High School, Schenectady
Scotia-Glenville High School, Scotia

Schoharie County

Cobleskill-Richmondville High School, Richmondville
Middleburgh High School, Middleburgh
Schoharie High School, Schoharie

Schuyler County

Odessa-Montour Junior/Senior High School, Odessa
Watkins Glen Central High School, Watkins Glen

Seneca County

Mynderse Academy, Seneca Falls
Romulus Junior/Senior High School, Romulus
South Seneca Junior/Senior High School, Ovid
Waterloo High School, Waterloo

Steuben County

Addison High School, Addison
Arkport Central, Arkport
Campbell-Savona Middle High School, Campbell
Canisteo Junior/Senior High School, Canisteo
Corning-Painted Post East High School, Corning
Corning-Painted Post West High School, Painted Post
Hammondsport Junior/Senior High School, Hammondsport
Hornell High School, Hornell
Jasper-Troupsburg Junior/Senior High School, Jasper
Wayland-Cohocton High School, Wayland
Bradford Central School, Bradford

Suffolk County

Academy of Saint Joseph's High School, Brentwood
Amityville Memorial High School, Amityville
Babylon Junior/Senior High School, Babylon
Bay Shore High School, Bay Shore
Bayport-Blue Point High School, Bayport
Bellport High School, Brookhaven
Brentwood High School, Brentwood
Bridgehampton School, Bridgehampton
Center Moriches High School, Center Moriches
Centereach High School, Centereach
Central Islip Senior High School, Central Islip
Cold Spring Harbor Jr./Sr. High School, Cold Spring Harbor
Commack High School, Commack
Comsewogue High School, Port Jefferson Station
Connetquot High School, Bohemia
Deer Park High School, Deer Park
East Hampton High School, East Hampton
East Islip High School, Islip Terrace
Eastport South Manor Junior-Senior High School, Manorville
John Glenn High School, Elwood
Greenport High School, Greenport
Half Hollow Hills High School East, Dix Hills
Half Hollow Hills High School West, Dix Hills
Hampton Bays Secondary School, Hampton Bays
Harborfields High School, Greenlawn
Hauppauge High School, Hauppauge
Huntington High School, Huntington
Islip High School, Islip
Kings Park High School, Kings Park
The Knox School, Saint James
Lake Grove School, Lake Grove
Lindenhurst Senior High School, Lindenhurst
Longwood High School, Middle Island
Mattituck Junior/Senior High School, Mattituck
Mercy High School, Riverhead
Miller Place High School, Miller Place
Mount Sinai High School, Mount Sinai
Newfield High School, Selden
North Babylon High School, North Babylon
Northport High School, Northport
Patchogue-Medford High School, Medford
Pierson High School, Sag Harbor
Riverhead High School, Riverhead
Rocky Point High School, Rocky Point
Ross School, East Hampton
Sachem High School East, Farmingville
Sachem High School North, Lake Ronkonkoma
St. Anthony's High School, South Huntington
St. John the Baptist Diocesan High School, West Islip
Sappo School, Medford
Sayville High School, West Sayville
Shoreham-Wading River High School, Shoreham
Smithtown Christian School, Smithtown
Smithtown High School West, Smithtown
Smithtown High School East, Saint James
Southampton High School, Southampton
Southold Junior/Senior High School, Southold
The Stony Brook School, Stony Brook
Torah Academy of Suffolk County, Commack
Earl L. Vandermeulen High School, Port Jefferson
Walter G. O'Connell Copiague High School, Copiague
Ward Melville High School, Setauket
West Babylon High School, West Babylon
West Islip High School, West Islip
Westhampton Beach High School, Westhampton Beach
Walt Whitman High School, Huntington Station
William Floyd High School, Mastic Beach
Wyandanch Memorial High School, Wyandanch

Sullivan County

Eldred Junior/Senior High School, Eldred
Fallsburg Jr./Sr. High School, Fallsburg
Liberty High School, Liberty
Livingston Manor High School, Livingston Manor
Monticello High School, Monticello
Sullivan West Central School, Lake Huntington
Tri-Valley Central School, Grahamsville

Tioga County

Candor Junior/Senior High School, Candor
Newark Valley High School, Newark Valley
Owego Free Academy, Owego
Spencer-Van Etten Middle/High School, Spencer
Tioga High School, Tioga Center
Waverly High School, Waverly

Tompkins County

Charles O. Dickerson High School, Trumansburg
Dryden High School, Dryden
Groton High School, Groton
Ithaca High School, Ithaca
Lansing High School, Lansing
Lehman Alternative Community School
Newfield High School, Newfield
George Junior Republic School, Freeville

Ulster County

John A. Coleman Catholic High School, Hurley
Ellenville High School, Ellenville
Highland Chodikee School, Highland
Highland High School, Highland
Kingston High School, Kingston
Marlboro High School, Marlboro
New Paltz High School, New Paltz
Onteora High School, Boiceville
Rondout Valley High School, Accord
Saugerties High School, Saugerties
Wallkill Senior High School, Wallkill
Woodstock Day School, Saugerties

Warren County

Bolton Central School District, Bolton
Glens Falls High School, Glens Falls
Hadley-Luzerne High School, Lake Luzerne
Lake George Junior-Senior High School, Lake George
Queensbury High School, Queensbury, New York
Warrensburg Junior/Senior High School, Warrensburg

Washington County

The Adirondack School of Northeastern New York, Greenwich
Argyle High School, Argyle
Cambridge Junior/Senior High School, Cambridge
Granville Junior/Senior High School, Granville
Greenwich Junior/Senior High School, Greenwich
Hudson Falls High School, Hudson Falls
Salem High School, Salem
Whitehall Junior/Senior High School, Whitehall

Wayne County

Clyde Junior/Senior High School, Clyde
Gananda / R A Cirillo High School, Wallworth
Lyons High School, Lyons
Marion Junior/Senior High School, Marion
Newark High School, Newark
North Rose-Wolcott High School, Wollcott
Palmyra-Macedon High School, Pal-Mac
Red Creek High School, Red Creek River
Sodus High School, Sodus
Wayne Senior High School, Ontario Center
Williamson Senior High School, Williamson

Westchester County

Academy of Our Lady of Good Counsel, White Plains
Archbishop Stepinac High School, White Plains
Ardsley High School, Ardsley
Blessed Sacrament-St. Gabriel High School, New Rochelle
Blind Brook High School, Rye Brook
Briarcliff High School, Briarcliff Manor
Bronxville High School, Bronxville
Byram Hills High School, Armonk
Croton-Harmon High School, Croton-on-Hudson
Dobbs Ferry High School, Dobbs Ferry
Early College High School, Yonkers
Eastchester High School, Eastchester
Edgemont Junior – Senior High School, Greenburgh
Fox Lane High School, Bedford
Gorton High School, Yonkers
Horace Greeley High School, Chappaqua
Greenburgh Eleven High School, Dobbs Ferry
Alexander Hamilton Jr./Sr. High School, Elmsford
Harrison High School, Harrison
Hastings High School, Hastings-on-Hudson
Hawthorne-Cedar Knolls High School, Hawthorne
Hendrick Hudson High School, Montrose
High School of Travel & Tourism, Yonkers
Iona Preparatory School, New Rochelle
Irvington High School, Irvington
Ives School, Lincolndale
John Jay High School, Cross River
Karafin School, Mount Kisco
Keio Academy of New York, Purchase
John F. Kennedy Catholic High School, Somers
Martin Luther King Junior High School, Hastings-on-Hudson
Lakeland High School, Shrub Oak
Lincoln High School, Yonkers
Linden Hill Residential Treatment Facility, Hawthorne
Mamaroneck High School, Mamaroneck
Nelson Mandela Community High School, Mount Vernon
Maria Regina High School, Hartsdale
Mount Vernon High School, Mount Vernon
New Rochelle High School, New Rochelle
North Salem Middle/High School, North Salem
Ohr Hameir Boys Yeshiva School, Peekskill
Ossining High School, Ossining
Our Lady of Victory Academy, Dobbs Ferry
Palisade Preparatory School, Yonkers
Walter Panas High School, Cortlandt Manor
Park Street School, Peekskill
Peekskill High School, Peekskill
Pelham Memorial High School, Pelham
Phoenix High School, Shrub Oak
Pleasantville High School, Pleasantville
Port Chester High School, Rye Brook
Riverside High School for Engineering and Design, Yonkers
Roosevelt High School, Yonkers
Rye High School, Rye
Rye Neck High School, Mamaroneck
Sacred Heart High School, Yonkers
Salesian High School, New Rochelle
Saunders Trades and Technical High School, Yonkers
Scarsdale High School, Scarsdale
Sleepy Hollow Middle High School, Sleepy Hollow
Solomon Schechter School of Westchester, Hartsdale
Somers High School, Somers
Tuckahoe High School, Eastchester
The Ursuline School, New Rochelle
Valhalla High School, Valhalla
Westchester Hebrew High School, Mamaroneck
Westlake High School, Thornwood
White Plains High School, White Plains
Woodlands High School, Hartsdale
Yonkers High School, Yonkers
Yonkers Montessori Academy, Yonkers
Yorktown High School, Yorktown Heights
Additional schools

Wyoming County

Attica High School, Attica
Letchworth High School, Gainesville
Perry High School, Perry
Warsaw Junior/Senior High School, Warsaw

Yates County

Dundee Junior/Senior High School, Dundee
Penn Yan Academy, Penn Yan

See also
List of school districts in New York

References

New York
High